Sitapur City Junction railway station is a railway station in Sitapur district, Uttar Pradesh, India. Its code is SPC. It serves Sitapur old city. The station consists of three platforms. The platforms are not well sheltered. It lacks many facilities including water and sanitation.

References

Railway stations in Sitapur district
Moradabad railway division
Sitapur